Travis Pearson (born July 25, 1971) is a former American football player who played seven seasons in the Arena Football League (AFL) with the Tampa Bay Storm, Miami Hooters, Florida Bobcats and Los Angeles Avengers. He played college football at Alabama State University. He was named to the Arena Football League 15th Anniversary Team in 2001.

Professional career
Pearson played for the Tampa Bay Storm, Miami Hooters, Florida Bobcats and Los Angeles Avengers of the AFL from 1994 to 2001.

Coaching career
Pearson was the head coach at Central High School in Hayneville, Alabama from 1998 to 1999. He was an assistant coach at Elmore County High School in Eclectic, Alabama from 2000 to 2001. He was then Elmore's head coach from 2002 to 2004. He was the defensive coordinator at Oxford High School in Oxford, Alabama from 2005 to 2006.

He was the director of football operations for the Iowa State Cyclones of Iowa State University from 2007 to 2008. He served as head coach and athletic director at Jefferson Davis High School in Montgomery, Alabama from 2009 to 2010. He was the defensive coordinator at Colquitt County High School in Moultrie, Georgia from 2011 to 2012.

Pearson was the linebackers coach for the South Alabama Jaguars of the University of South Alabama in 2013. He then served as the Jaguars' defensive coordinator from 2014 to 2015. He became the defensive coordinator and secondary coach of the Alabama A&M Bulldogs in 2016.

Head coaching record

College

References

External links
 Troy profile
 Alabama State profile
 Just Sports Stats

1971 births
Living people
American football fullbacks
American football linebackers
Alabama A&M Bulldogs football coaches
Alabama State Hornets football coaches
Alabama State Hornets football players
Florida Bobcats players
Iowa State Cyclones football coaches
Miami Hooters players
South Alabama Jaguars football coaches
Los Angeles Avengers players
Tampa Bay Storm players
Troy Trojans football coaches
High school football coaches in Alabama
High school football coaches in Georgia (U.S. state)
People from Choctaw County, Alabama
Coaches of American football from Alabama
Players of American football from Alabama
African-American coaches of American football
African-American players of American football
20th-century African-American sportspeople
21st-century African-American sportspeople